A regular octahedron has 24 rotational (or orientation-preserving) symmetries, and 48 symmetries altogether. These include transformations that combine a reflection and a rotation. A cube has the same set of symmetries, since it is the polyhedron that is dual to an octahedron.

The group of orientation-preserving symmetries is S4, the symmetric group or the group of permutations of four objects, since there is exactly one such symmetry for each permutation of the four diagonals of the cube.

Details

Chiral and full (or achiral) octahedral symmetry are the discrete point symmetries (or equivalently, symmetries on the sphere) with the largest symmetry groups compatible with translational symmetry. They are among the crystallographic point groups of the cubic crystal system.

A rotoreflection is a combination of rotation and reflection.

Chiral octahedral symmetry

O, 432, or [4,3]+ of order 24, is chiral octahedral symmetry or rotational octahedral symmetry .  This group is like chiral tetrahedral symmetry T, but the C2 axes are now C4 axes, and additionally there are 6 C2 axes, through the midpoints of the edges of the cube.  Td and O are isomorphic as abstract groups: they both correspond to S4, the symmetric group on 4 objects. Td is the union of T and the set obtained by combining each element of O \ T with inversion. O is the rotation group of the cube and the regular octahedron.

Full octahedral symmetry
Oh, *432, [4,3], or m3m of order 48 - achiral octahedral symmetry or full octahedral symmetry. This group has the  same rotation axes as O, but with mirror planes, comprising both the mirror planes of Td and Th.  This group is isomorphic to S4.C2, and is the full symmetry group of the cube and octahedron. It is the hyperoctahedral group for n = 3. See also the isometries of the cube.

With the 4-fold axes as coordinate axes, a fundamental domain of Oh is given by 0 ≤ x ≤ y ≤ z. An object with this symmetry is characterized by the part of the object in the fundamental domain, for example the cube is given by z = 1, and the octahedron by x + y + z = 1 (or the corresponding inequalities, to get the solid instead of the surface).
ax + by + cz = 1 gives a polyhedron with 48 faces, e.g. the disdyakis dodecahedron.

Faces are 8-by-8 combined to larger faces for a = b = 0 (cube) and 6-by-6 for a = b = c (octahedron).

The 9 mirror lines of full octahedral symmetry can be divided into two subgroups of 3 and 6 (drawn in purple and red), representing in two orthogonal subsymmetries: D2h, and Td. D2h symmetry can be doubled to D4h by restoring 2 mirrors from one of three orientations.

Rotation matrices
Take the set of all 3×3 permutation matrices and assign a + or − sign to each of the three 1s. There are  permutations and  sign combinations for a total of 48 matrices, giving the full octahedral group. 24 of these matrices have a determinant of +1; these are the rotation matrices of the chiral octahedral group. The other 24 matrices have a determinant of −1 and correspond to a reflection or inversion.

Three reflectional generator matices are needed for octahedral symmetry, which represent the three mirrors of a Coxeter-Dynkin diagram. The product of the reflections produce 3 rotational generators.

Subgroups of full octahedral symmetry

The isometries of the cube

The cube has 48 isometries (symmetry elements), forming the symmetry group Oh, isomorphic to S4 × Z2. They can be categorized as follows:
O (the identity and 23 proper rotations) with the following conjugacy classes (in parentheses are given the permutations of the body diagonals and the unit quaternion representation):
identity (identity; 1)
rotation about an axis from the center of a face to the center of the opposite face  by an angle of 90°: 3 axes, 2 per axis, together 6 ((1 2 3 4), etc.; ((1 ± i)/, etc.)
ditto by an angle of 180°: 3 axes, 1 per axis, together 3 ((1 2) (3 4), etc.; i, j, k)
rotation about an axis from the center of an edge to the center of the opposite edge by an angle of 180°: 6 axes, 1 per axis, together 6 ((1 2), etc.; ((i ± j)/, etc.)
rotation about a body diagonal by an angle of 120°: 4 axes, 2 per axis, together 8 ((1 2 3), etc.; (1 ± i ± j ± k)/2)
The same with inversion (x is mapped to −x) (also 24 isometries). Note that rotation by an angle of 180° about an axis combined with inversion is just reflection in the perpendicular plane. The combination of inversion and rotation about a body diagonal by an angle of 120° is rotation about the body diagonal by an angle of 60°, combined with reflection in the perpendicular plane (the rotation itself does not map the cube to itself; the intersection of the reflection plane with the cube is a regular hexagon).

An isometry of the cube can be identified in various ways:
by the faces three given adjacent faces (say 1, 2, and 3 on a die) are mapped to
by the image of a cube with on one face a non-symmetric marking: the face with the marking, whether it is normal or a mirror image, and the orientation
by a permutation of the four body diagonals (each of the 24 permutations is possible), combined with a toggle for inversion of the cube, or not

For cubes with colors or markings (like dice have), the symmetry group is a subgroup of Oh.

Examples:
C4v, [4], (*422): if one face has a different color (or two opposite faces have colors different from each other and from the other four), the cube has 8 isometries, like a square has in 2D.
D2h, [2,2], (*222): if opposite faces have the same colors, different for each set of two, the cube has 8 isometries, like a cuboid.
D4h, [4,2], (*422): if two opposite faces have the same color, and all other faces have one different color, the cube has 16 isometries, like a square prism (square box).
C2v, [2], (*22):
if two adjacent faces have the same color, and all other faces have one different color, the cube has 4 isometries.
if three faces, of which two opposite to each other, have one color and the other three one other color, the cube has 4 isometries.
if two opposite faces have the same color, and two other opposite faces also, and the last two have different colors, the cube has 4 isometries, like a piece of blank paper with a shape with a mirror symmetry.
Cs, [ ], (*):
if two adjacent faces have colors different from each other, and the other four have a third color, the cube has 2 isometries.
if two opposite faces have the same color, and all other faces have  different colors, the cube has 2 isometries, like an asymmetric piece of blank paper.
C3v, [3], (*33): if three faces, of which none opposite to each other, have one color and the other three one other color, the cube has 6 isometries.

For some larger subgroups a cube with that group as symmetry group is not possible with just coloring whole faces. One has to draw some pattern on the faces.

Examples:
D2d, [2+,4], (2*2): if one face has a line segment dividing the face into two equal rectangles, and the opposite has the same in perpendicular direction, the cube has 8 isometries; there is a symmetry plane and 2-fold rotational symmetry with an axis at an angle of 45° to that plane, and, as a result, there is also another symmetry plane perpendicular to the first, and another axis of 2-fold rotational symmetry perpendicular to the first.
Th, [3+,4], (3*2): if each face has a line segment dividing the face into two equal rectangles, such that the line segments of adjacent faces do not meet at the edge, the cube has 24 isometries: the even permutations of the body diagonals and the same combined with inversion (x is mapped to −x).
Td, [3,3], (*332): if the cube consists of eight smaller cubes, four white and four black, put together alternatingly in all three standard directions, the cube has again 24 isometries: this time the even permutations of the body diagonals and the inverses of the other proper rotations.
T, [3,3]+, (332): if each face has the same pattern with 2-fold rotational symmetry, say the letter S, such that at all edges a top of one S meets a side of the other S, the cube has 12 isometries: the even permutations of the body diagonals.

The full symmetry of the cube, Oh, [4,3], (*432), is preserved if and only if all faces have the same pattern such that the full symmetry of the square is preserved, with for the square a symmetry group, Dih4, [4], of order 8.

The full symmetry of the cube under proper rotations, O, [4,3]+, (432), is preserved if and only if all faces have the same pattern with 4-fold rotational symmetry, Z4, [4]+.

Octahedral symmetry of the Bolza surface
In Riemann surface theory, the Bolza surface, sometimes called the Bolza curve, is obtained as the ramified double cover of the Riemann sphere, with ramification locus at the set of vertices of the regular inscribed octahedron.  Its automorphism group includes the hyperelliptic involution which flips the two sheets of the cover.  The quotient by the order 2 subgroup generated by the hyperelliptic involution yields precisely the group of symmetries of the octahedron.  Among the many remarkable properties of the Bolza surface is the fact that it maximizes the systole among all genus 2 hyperbolic surfaces.

Solids with octahedral chiral symmetry

Solids with full octahedral symmetry

See also
Tetrahedral symmetry
Icosahedral symmetry
Binary octahedral group
Hyperoctahedral group

References 

 Peter R. Cromwell, Polyhedra (1997), p. 295
 The Symmetries of Things 2008, John H. Conway, Heidi Burgiel, Chaim Goodman-Strauss, 
 Kaleidoscopes: Selected Writings of H.S.M. Coxeter, edited by F. Arthur Sherk, Peter McMullen, Anthony C. Thompson, Asia Ivic Weiss, Wiley-Interscience Publication, 1995,  
 N.W. Johnson: Geometries and Transformations, (2018)  Chapter 11: Finite symmetry groups, 11.5 Spherical Coxeter groups

External links
 
 Groupprops: Direct product of S4 and Z2

Finite groups
Rotational symmetry